CBU is a Canadian radio station, which airs the programming of the CBC Radio One network, in Vancouver, British Columbia. The station broadcasts on 690 AM (a clear channel frequency) and on 88.1 FM as CBU-2-FM. CBU's newscasts and local shows are also heard on a chain of CBC stations around the Lower Mainland.

CBU's studios and offices are in the CBC Regional Broadcast Centre at 700 Hamilton Street in Downtown Vancouver. The AM transmitter is in the Steveston section of Richmond and the FM transmitter is on Mount Seymour.

CBU began transmitting in 1967 at 50,000 watts, the highest power authorized by the Canadian Radio-television and Telecommunications Commission (CRTC), allowing it to be heard throughout the Metro Vancouver Regional District and around the British Columbia Coast. CBU's signal power was reduced to 25,000 watts after a 2017 fire.

History 
The station was launched in 1925 as CNRV The Voice of the Pacific on 1100 AM, owned by the Canadian National Railway radio network. CNRV was acquired by the Canadian Radio Broadcasting Commission in 1933, becoming CRCV. In 1936, the CBC was created, taking over the CRBC's operations, and CRCV became CBR.
The transmitter was located on No. 4 Road in Richmond. This site was in use from 1938 to 1976.

The station moved to 1130 in 1941 (see Canadian allocations changes under NARBA), and to 690 in 1952 when the call sign was changed to its current CBU. Power was increased from 10,000 watts to 50,000 watts in 1967 with a transmitter site move to the Steveston shoreline.

In 1947, an FM simulcast was launched on CBU-FM. Distinct programming on the FM station was aired for the first time in 1964.

In early 2008 the CRTC approved CBU's application for a simulcast of its programming on the FM band. On October 10, 2008, CBU began testing its FM simulcast on 88.1 FM as CBU-2-FM with an effective radiated power of 19,500 watts, and it officially signed on soon after. Around the same time, the CBC also applied to broadcast on separate transmitters into Nanaimo, as well as the Sunshine Coast, with the intent to shut down the AM transmitter on 690 kHz if approved. The CRTC denied these other two transmitters due to the lack of available frequencies in the region.

Among Radio One stations on the AM dial around Canada, CBU serves the largest area of population, since Montreal and Toronto are served by FM stations. CBM Montreal moved to CBME-FM in 1998, and CBL Toronto's moved to CBLA-FM in 1999.

In 2011 CBC applied to the CRTC to increase the coverage area of CBU-2-FM's transmitter. CBC has proposed to increase the height of the antenna and to increase the ERP to 97,600 watts. The ability to increase the signal coverage area is made possible by the fact that CHEK-DT in Victoria moved from the adjacent VHF TV channel 6 to 49, as part of the over-the-air digital television transition. This CBC transmitter application was approved September 13, 2012.

In November 2018, CBU reduced its full-time power from 50,000 to 25,000 watts. A fire destroyed part of the station’s transmitting facilities in 2017 and it was decided repairs would have been too costly.

CBU transmits in HD Radio on 88.1 MHz. , this signal provides simulcasts of CBU-FM on subchannel HD2 and CBCV-FM on subchannel HD3.

Shortwave relay
In 1941, CBR established a shortwave relay for remote areas of British Columbia using the call sign CBRX and operating on a frequency of 6.16 MHz (in the 49m band) with a power of 150 watts. The call sign changed to CBUX in 1952 when the AM station became CBU.

In 1965, the call sign changed to CKZU, recognizing that the ITU prefix CB was not assigned to Canada, but to Chile. The station was given permission to increase its power to 1,000 watts in 1986. The transmitter was adjacent to CBU's AM transmitter.

In February 2017, it was announced that CKZU was unlikely to return to shortwave. The CBC stated that the transmitter was in a state of disrepair with no replacement parts available due to aging equipment. Purchasing a new transmitter would be too costly due to the minimal number of listeners who tune into the facility.

Local programming
CBU's local programs are The Early Edition, hosted by Stephen Quinn, in the morning; and On the Coast, hosted by Gloria Macarenko, in the afternoon. CBU also originates the lunch-hour show BC Today, hosted by Michelle Eliot, as well as the weekend programs North By Northwest, hosted by Sheryl MacKay, in the morning; and Hot Air, hosted by Margaret Gallagher, on Saturday afternoons. These shows (except for The Early Edition and On the Coast) are broadcast province-wide to Radio One's stations in Victoria, Kelowna, Kamloops, Prince Rupert and Prince George, as well as their respective rebroadcasters.

Transmitters

CBU's signal on 690 AM also directly broadcasts to Nanaimo and Gibsons.

Current on-air staff
 Amy Bell, weekday morning traffic reporter
 Michelle Eliot, host of weekday noon-hour program BC Today
 Margaret Gallagher, host of Saturday afternoon music program Hot Air
 Gloria Macarenko, host of weekday afternoon program On the Coast
 Sheryl MacKay, host of weekend morning program North By Northwest
 Stephen Quinn, host of weekday morning program The Early Edition
 Robert Zimmerman, morning news editor

Former CBU personalities
 Rick Cluff, former host of The Early Edition
 Anne Petrie, former host of CBU radio program 3's Company

References

External links

 CBC British Columbia
 
 
 
 Bureau of Broadcast Management; PPM Top-line Radio Statistics, Vancouver CTRL

BU
BU
Canadian Radio Broadcasting Commission
Radio stations established in 1925
1925 establishments in British Columbia
CNR Radio